Asaad Abu Gilel al-Taie (born March 3, 1952) is the former SCIRI governor of Najaf province, in Iraq. He now works as the Head of Africa Department at the Headquarters of Iraqi Ministry of Foreign Affairs. He has Finnish citizenship, because he and his family have lived there as refugees since the 1990s.

Marriage and children

He has seven children.
Hussein al-Taee is the oldest child. He was elected to the Finnish Parliament 2019.

References 

Governors of Najaf Governorate
Living people
Iraqi politicians
Finnish people of Iraqi descent
Iraqi refugees
Refugees in Finland
1952 births
Naturalized citizens of Finland